William Speakman-Pitt, VC (21 September 1927 – 20 June 2018), known as Bill Speakman, was a British Army soldier and a recipient of the Victoria Cross, the highest award for gallantry in the face of the enemy that can be awarded to British and Commonwealth forces. He was the first person to receive an honour from Queen Elizabeth II.

Military career
He was born and brought up in Altrincham, Cheshire, and educated at Wellington Road School, Timperley. He was 24 years old and a private in the Black Watch (Royal Highland Regiment), British Army, attached to the 1st Battalion, King's Own Scottish Borderers during the Korean War when the following deed took place at United Hill, for which he was awarded the VC.

On 4 November 1951 in Korea, when the section holding the left shoulder of the company's position had been seriously depleted by casualties and was being overrun by the enemy, Speakman, on his own initiative, filled his pockets with grenades going forward and pelting the Chinese with the grenades.  Having thrown all of the grenades he had taken, he returned for more.  Inspired by his actions six men joined him in collecting a pile of grenades and followed him in a series of charges. He broke up several enemy attacks, causing heavy casualties and in spite of being wounded in the leg and the shoulder continued to lead charge after charge. Such was the ferocity of the fighting that they ran low on ammunition, resorting to throwing stones and ration tins. The enemy was kept at bay long enough to enable his company to withdraw safely. The Press of the time nicknamed him the 'beerbottle' VC, something he disliked for fear that it suggested he and his colleagues drank beer while on duty; the beer was in fact used to cool gun barrels.

Although his award was made by King George VI, Speakman was the first VC invested by Queen Elizabeth II. He later achieved the rank of sergeant and served in Malaya (with the Special Air Service), Borneo and Radfan. Whilst in Malaya he was involved in finding and returning the bodies of two soldiers killed in a clash with Communist insurgents in the jungle.

Later life
Due to financial hardship, Speakman sold his original VC, using the money to put a new roof on his cottage, but later bought a replacement to wear. His Victoria Cross is displayed in the National War Museum of Scotland in Edinburgh Castle. He was interviewed for the 2006 television docudrama Victoria Cross Heroes, which also included archive footage and dramatisations of his actions.

In a ceremony held in Seoul on 21 April 2015 for visiting veterans of the Korean War, Speakman gave a replica of his Victoria Cross and other medals to the people and government of South Korea. Speakman became an in-pensioner of the Royal Hospital Chelsea. Speakman died on 20 June 2018. His ashes were buried in the United Nations Memorial Cemetery, South Korea on 19 February 2019.

References

Further reading
 The Last Eleven? (Mark Adkin, 1991)
 One of the originals: The story of a founder member of the SAS" (Johnny Cooper, 1991)
 Monuments to Courage (David Harvey, 1999)
 The Register of the Victoria Cross (This England, 1997)
 Symbol of Courage:A History of the Victoria Cross (Max Arthur, 2004)
 Beyond the Legend: Bill Speakman VC'' (Derek Hunt & John Mulholland, The History Press, 2013)

External links
 

1927 births
2018 deaths
British recipients of the Victoria Cross
Black Watch soldiers
People from Altrincham
Special Air Service soldiers
British military personnel of the Aden Emergency
British Army personnel of the Korean War
British Army personnel of the Malayan Emergency
British Army personnel of the Indonesia–Malaysia confrontation
British Army recipients of the Victoria Cross
Recipients of the Order of Military Merit (Korea)
Chelsea Pensioners
Military personnel from Cheshire